Guo Qilin (born February 8, 1996) is an actor and a crosstalk (Xiangsheng) performer. Xiangsheng (相声), also known as crosstalk, is a traditional art form that was originally used for selling things on the street. Then it developed into a stage performance that intends to make audiences laugh. Guo Qilin is famous for his appearances in Deyunshe crosstalk performances and the TV series My Heroic Husband. He was awarded Best Actor at the 13th Macau International Festival. His debut drama The Story of Niu Tianci  built a strong fanbase for him, and he won the New Actor of the Year in the 2021 One Drama Awards.

Personal life 
Guo Qilin (郭奇林）, known professionally as Guo Qilin （郭麒麟） was born February 8, 1996, in Tianjin, China. He is a crosstalk performer, and an actor. His father is Guo Degang（郭德纲）, the owner of Deyunshe（德云社）. His teacher is Yu Qian（于谦）, and his partner is Yan Hexiang（阎鹤祥）. He plays an important role in Deyunshe, not only because he is the owner's son, also because he wants to revitalize the art form. He wishes that people can start to enjoy crosstalk through his performances. He was fond of crosstalk and Peking opera since he was around three years old, and he was able to tell stories in the crosstalk form when he was five.

Career

Crosstalk in Deyunshe 
In 2011, Guo Qilin quit school and began performing as a crosstalk performer in Deyun Team 4（德云四队）. In 2012, he held a personal special performance in the Beijing Exhibition Center, and it made him the youngest crosstalk performer that having a personal performance.

Film career 
He expanded his career in both film and television. In 2015, he was the main actor in the movie Our Happiness directed by his father Guo Degang. It was the first time that he made an appearance on the movie screen. He slowly found the enthusiasm that he felt for movies and theater. He was one of the main actors in the movie Adoring that was released in 2019. His natural performance boosted his reputation in the Chinese film industry. A lot of people starting to pay attention to him as a professional actor instead of just a comedian. He has two movies that with good casts and productions are coming out in 2022. One is Ride On, starring Jackie Chan and Liu Haocun; the other one is World's Greatest Dad, starring Yu Hewei and Ni Hongjie. His collaboration with these talented actor helped him build a solid position in the whole entertainment industry.

TV career 
In 2021, Qilin was one of the lead actors in the TV series My Heroic Husband, alongside the actress Song Yi. After the first episode was presented, Guo Qilin's performance obtained a large number of positive feedback. The popularity of this TV series has reached 10,000 points in iQiYi, breaking the record on the streaming platform. Guo Qilin proved to the world that "one day, I can stand in the crowd and let all of you know that it's my play, and I nailed it."

Stage career 
Guo Qilin made his stage debut in 2019 with the role of Niu Tianci. He won the New Actor of the Year in the 2021 One Drama Awards for his leading role in the drama The Story of Niu Tianci.

Filmography

Films

TV Series

Voice

Theater

Awards

Charity Work 
On July 21, 2021, Guo Qilin donated 1 million yuan to the Red Cross Society of Zhengzhou due to the flooding disaster.

References 

1996 births
Living people

Chinese xiangsheng performers
Chinese male television actors
Chinese male film actors
Chinese male stage actors